The governor of Chukotka Autonomous Okrug is the chief executive of Chukotka, an autonomous region in the Russian Far East.

History of office 
On 11 November 1991 Chairman of the Executive Committee of the Council of Deputies of Chukotka Aleksandr Nazarov was appointed Head of Administration of the autonomy by Russian president Boris Yeltsin. During Nazarov administration, there was a sharp decline in industrial production, most of the miner settlements were liquidated. The population of Chukotka decreased from nearly 164,000 people in 1989 to 54,000 in 2002. In 2000, during Nazarov's reelection campaign, he was summoned for interrogation by the Federal Tax Police Service. Shortly after he withdrew his candidacy.

Nazarov was succeeded by Roman Abramovich, a Russian oligarch and member of the 3rd State Duma from the Chukotka constituency. According to media reports, he invested a lot of his own funds in the development of the region and improving the living standards of the local population. Abramovich asked president Putin to accept his resignation at least two times: in December 2006, and in the fall of 2007, but these attempts were unsuccessful. He resigned in July 2008 and was succeeded by Roman Kopin, former head of Bilibinsky District.

List of office-holders

References

 
Politics of Chukotka Autonomous Okrug
Chukotka